Rajmahal railway station is a railway station on the branch of Sahibganj loop line under the Malda railway division of Eastern Railway zone. It is situated beside State Highway 10 at Rajmahal in Sahebganj district in the Indian state of Jharkhand.

References

Railway stations in Sahibganj district
Malda railway division